Flynn Creek crater, is an impact crater situated in Jackson County, approximately 8 km south of Gainesboro, Tennessee, USA. It was formed approximately 360 million years ago as a shallow, saucer-shaped crater,  in diameter and about 150 m deep. A large central hill, highly deformed rim strata, and a breccia lens  in thickness were produced during formation. The remaining breccia contains fragments ranging in size from small grains to megabreccia blocks  in length. Undisturbed strata lie 100 m below the original crater floor.

In the middle of the crater, a sequence of steeply-dipping, folded, faulted, and brecciated Middle Ordovician limestone and dolomite has been uplifted  to form a large central hill.

In the rim surrounding the crater, Ordovician limestone has been uplifted , and is moderately to tightly folded into doubly plunging anticlines and synclines that have axes concentric to the crater walls.  In parts of the rim, folds have resulted in radial shortening as great as 35%.  Faulting is common in the rim strata and is usually concentric to the crater walls.

In the southeastern rim, a large thrust block forms the crater wall and has been moved out from the crater and uplifted about 50 m. Overlying this graben is a layer of breccia which is apparently the remains of an ejecta blanket that once surrounded the crater.

Post-crater erosion removed the ejecta, except for that overlying the graben, and lowered the regional ground surface less than 30 m.  Within a few million years of the cratering event the entire structure was covered with shale deposits from the early Late Devonian Chattanooga Sea, creating one of the best-preserved ancient impact structures presently known.  Subsequent erosion along Flynn Creek drainage has exposed a large extent of the structure.  Karst development in the immediate area has created numerous caves associated with impact features, including the only cave known to occur in the central uplift of an impact structure, Hawkins Impact Cave.

Flynn Creek crater facts

~3830m diameter 
 ~200m depth (minus breccia lens) 
 ~20m max pre-impact relief 
 ~15m max depth of water at time of impact 
 ~40m avg breccia thickness 
 ~140m avg breccia depth below crater floor 
 ~35% max radial shortening of rim strata 
 ~90-190m range for bolide diameter 
 roughly polygonal shape 
 lateral zone of disturbance averages 1000 m in extent from crater wall 
 lowermost size limit for complex craters with central uplifts 
 1700 m of sediments overlying crystalline basement in area 
 estimated length of time for initial crater formation: <60 seconds 
 conodonts found in immediate crater infill indicate marine environment 
 central uplift is composed of strata which have been structurally uplifted 300 m above normal position 
 11.2–72 km/s--max velocity range for terrestrial impacting bodies 
 25 km/s--total vaporization of stony bolides

References

External links
Exploration of the Flynn Creek crater

Landforms of Jackson County, Tennessee
Impact craters of the United States
Devonian impact craters
Geology of Tennessee